Víctor José Añino Bermúdez (born 9 September 1983), known as Vitolo, is a Spanish professional footballer who plays for CD Santa Úrsula as a defensive midfielder.

He began his career at Tenerife, going on to appear in 67 a total of La Liga matches for that club and Racing de Santander and returning to the former in 2014. He also competed extensively in Greece, mainly with PAOK and Panathinaikos.

Vitolo won 18 caps for Spain at youth level, being runner-up with the under-20 team at the 2003 World Cup.

Club career
Vitolo was born in Santa Cruz de Tenerife, Canary Islands. A product of CD Tenerife's youth system, he played one match for the first team during the 2001–02 season as the club returned to the Segunda División one year after being promoted. He made his debut in La Liga on 16 September 2001, coming on as a 76th-minute substitute in a 2–0 home win against Villarreal CF.

From 2005 to 2007, Vitolo was a key midfield element for Racing de Santander, which finished tenth in the top division in the latter campaign. After some problems with newly appointed coach Marcelino García Toral, however, he would spend 2007–08 on loan to another side in the second tier, RC Celta de Vigo.

With the Galicians, Vitolo did not manage to return to the Spanish top flight, and his buyout clause of approximately €3 million was not activated, so the player returned to Cantabria. In August 2008, however, he terminated his contract and joined Aris Thessaloniki FC. Under compatriot Quique Hernández, he eventually developed into a key midfield element in his only season.

Vitolo signed a four-year deal with PAOK FC on 27 July 2009. He scored his first goal in Greece against his former club, in a 4–1 derby win.

On 13 July 2011, Vitolo was released by PAOK. Later in the same day he signed with another team in the country's Super League, Panathinaikos FC, agreeing to a three-year contract.

In the summer of 2013, Vitolo was released by Panathinaikos and joined Super Lig's Elazığspor for three years. However, in February of the following year he cut ties with the club, playing his last game in December 2013 in a 1–0 home victory over Rizespor; the side were eventually relegated in May, after ranking third-bottom.

Vitolo returned to Tenerife on 18 June 2014, after signing a two-year deal.

International career
Vitolo represented Spain at the 2003 FIFA World Youth Championship held at the United Arab Emirates, alongside the likes of Sergio García and Andrés Iniesta. During the competition he played holding midfielder with notable performances, as the team went on to lose 0–1 to Brazil in the final.

Eventually, Vitolo progressed to the under-21s.

Club statistics

Honours
Spain U20
FIFA U-20 World Cup runner-up: 2003

References

External links

1983 births
Living people
Spanish footballers
Footballers from Santa Cruz de Tenerife
Association football midfielders
La Liga players
Segunda División players
Segunda División B players
Tercera División players
Tercera Federación players
CD Tenerife B players
CD Tenerife players
Racing de Santander players
RC Celta de Vigo players
FC Cartagena footballers
Super League Greece players
Aris Thessaloniki F.C. players
PAOK FC players
Panathinaikos F.C. players
Süper Lig players
Elazığspor footballers
Spain youth international footballers
Spain under-21 international footballers
Spanish expatriate footballers
Expatriate footballers in Greece
Expatriate footballers in Turkey
Spanish expatriate sportspeople in Greece
Spanish expatriate sportspeople in Turkey